Dancing Sweeties (1930) is an American Pre-Code romantic comedy film with music directed by Ray Enright, released by Warner Bros., and starring Grant Withers and Sue Carol. The film is based on the story Three Flights Up by Harry Fried. Carol, then under contract to Fox Film, was loaned out to Warner Bros. for the making of this film.

Plot
Grant Withers is a conceited dancer who spends all his free time dancing. He leaves his partner Edna Murphy, after seeing Sue Carol in the dance hall. He enters the waltz contest with Carol and ends up winning the first prize. Soon after they are convinced to marry by Sid Silvers (the dance hall manager), who needs a new couple to marry in a live ceremony in the dance-hall after another couple cancelled. He convinces them when he offers them a free furnished apartment which the other couple forfeited by not showing up. Withers' and Carol's parents are shocked by news of the marriage. Withers soon gets bored of home-life and the in-laws and yearns for dancing again. He convinces Carol to join him in a dance contest, but when she is unable to perform the dance steps of a new fox-trot, they fight. The fighting continues until they split up. After a while, Grant realizes what he has lost but thinks it may be too late to patch things up.

Cast
 Grant Withers as Bill Cleaver 
 Sue Carol as Molly O'Neil
 Tully Marshall as Pa Cleaver 
 Edna Murphy as "Jazzbo" Gans 
 Adamae Vaughn as Emma O'Neil
 Eddie Phillips as Needles Thompson 
 Margaret Seddon as Mrs. Cleaver
 Sid Silvers as Jerry Browne

Songs
 "The Kiss Waltz" (Sung by Grant Withers and Sue Carol)
 "Dancing With Tears In My Eyes" (Cut from film before release)

Preservation status
The film survives complete and has been released by Warner Archive on DVD. It is also preserved at the Library of Congress.

See also
 List of early Warner Bros. sound and talking features

References
Notes

Bibliography
 Barrios, Richard. A Song in the Dark (Oxford University Press, 1995)

External links 
 
 
 
 

1930 films
Warner Bros. films
1930s English-language films
Films directed by Ray Enright
1930 musical comedy films
American black-and-white films
American musical comedy films
American romantic comedy films
1930 romantic comedy films
1930s American films